John Coughlin may refer to:

Sportsmen
 John Coughlin (footballer) (born 1963), head coach of East Stirlingshire F.C.
 John Coughlin (soccer) (born 1972), retired American soccer player
 John Coughlin (figure skater) (1985–2019), American pair skater
 John Coughlin (ice hockey), Canadian

Others
 John Coughlin (alderman) (1860–1938), Chicago
 John Coughlin (weatherman) (1925–2001), Chicago
 John Coughlin (police officer) (1874–1951), American law enforcement officer in the New York City Police Department
 John W. Coughlin (1861–1920), American physician and politician who served as mayor of Fall River, Massachusetts
 John Coughlin (soldier) (1837–1912), American soldier in the American Civil War

See also
Jack Coughlin (disambiguation)